Ashley Bascom Wright (May 25, 1841 – August 14, 1897) was an American politician. He was the chairman of the United States House Committee on Mileage in the fifty-fourth and fifty-fifth congresses.

Early life and education 
Wright was born in Hinsdale, Massachusetts on May 25, 1841. He attended public schools and Lincoln Academy in Hinsdale.

Career 
Wright moved to North Adams, Massachusetts, in 1861. In that year, he was appointed chief deputy collector of internal revenue for the tenth district of Massachusetts in 1861. He resigned from that position in 1865 to engage in mercantile pursuits.

Wright served as a selectman and commissioner for Berkshire County from 1884 to 1887 and acted as chairman for one year. He was a member of the State executive council in 1890 and 1891 before being elected as a Republican to the fifty-third, fifty-fourth and fifty-fifth congresses, serving from March 4, 1893, until his death.

Personal life 
Wright died in North Adams, Berkshire County, August 14, 1897. Wright is interred in the Hinsdale Cemetery.

See also
List of United States Congress members who died in office (1790–1899)

References

External links
 

1841 births
1897 deaths
People from North Adams, Massachusetts
Republican Party members of the United States House of Representatives from Massachusetts
19th-century American politicians
People from Hinsdale, Massachusetts